Homme is a village in Valle municipality in Agder county, Norway.

Popular culture
The forests around Homme have their own segment in David Attenborough's documentary, Planet Earth, in episode 10, Seasonal Forest.

References

Villages in Agder
Valle, Norway